ReAniMate 3.0: The CoVeRs eP is an EP by the American hard rock band Halestorm. It was released in the United States on January 6, 2017 as a follow up to ReAniMate 2.0: The CoVeRs eP (2013). ReAniMate 3.0 features Halestorm's covers of six songs, all from different artists.

Track listing

Personnel 
Adapted from the liner notes.

Halestorm
 Lzzy Hale – vocals, guitar
 Arejay Hale – drums
 Joe Hottinger – guitars
 Josh Smith – bass guitar

Charts

References 

2017 EPs
Halestorm albums
Atlantic Records EPs
Hard rock EPs
Covers EPs